Sodzülhou is a village located in the Chümoukedima District of Nagaland and is a suburb of Chümoukedima, the district headquarters.

Demographics
Sodzülhou is situated in the Chümoukedima District of Nagaland. As per the Population Census 2011, there are a total 185 households in Sodzülhou. The total population of Sodzülhou is 765.

See also
Chümoukedima District

References

Villages in Chümoukedima district